Sjeng Schalken was the defending champion, but lost in the first round this year.

Michaël Llodra won the title, beating Guillermo Coria 6–3, 6–4 in the final.

Seeds

Draw

Finals

Top half

Bottom half

References

 Main Draw
 Qualifying Draw

Rosmalen Grass Court Championships
2004 ATP Tour